Mohammad Syamil Syazwan Ramli (born 1988) is a Malaysian international lawn bowler.

Bowls career
In 2016 Ramli represented Malaysia at the 2016 World Outdoor Bowls Championship and two years later the 2018 Commonwealth Games. He has won two gold medals in the triples at the Lawn bowls at the 2017 Southeast Asian Games and the Lawn bowls at the 2019 Southeast Asian Games.

In 2020, he was selected for the 2020 World Outdoor Bowls Championship in Australia. In 2022, he competed in the men's triples and the men's fours at the 2022 Commonwealth Games.

References

Malaysian male bowls players
Living people
1988 births
Bowls players at the 2018 Commonwealth Games
Bowls players at the 2022 Commonwealth Games
Commonwealth Games competitors for Malaysia
Southeast Asian Games gold medalists for Malaysia
Southeast Asian Games medalists in lawn bowls